Jefferson Hurtado (born August 2, 1987) is an Ecuadorian footballer currently playing for El Nacional. He plays as a defender and is a regular starter for his club.

Club career
Jefferson came out as a professional at Barcelona SC. The new head coach of Barcelona SC Benito Floro request Hurtado's presence for the motivated project called La Renovacion.

Ajax is following Hurtado's great performance this year and are trying to sign him with the club for the next season.
Hurtado is also known to be one of the most promising defenders for Ecuadorian football.

Jefferson Scored his first goal in his career in the Copa Sudamericana 2010 against Universidad César Vallejo.

References

External links
Newspaper Telegrafo
Barcelona SC official web site
FEF player cards

1987 births
Living people
Ecuadorian footballers
Ecuadorian expatriate footballers
Barcelona S.C. footballers
Argentinos Juniors footballers
S.D. Quito footballers
C.D. El Nacional footballers
Expatriate footballers in Argentina
Argentine Primera División players
Association football defenders